Richard Kay Wildung  (August 16, 1921 – March 15, 2006) was an American football tackle  in the National Football League for the Green Bay Packers. Wildung attended the University of Minnesota, where he was a two-time consensus All-American as a tackle following the 1941 and 1942 seasons. He was elected as captain of the team. While in college he was a member of Phi Delta Theta fraternity. He served in World War II as a Navy lieutenant on a PT boat in the Pacific Ocean from 1943 through 1945.

Wildung was drafted in the first round of the 1943 NFL draft by the Green Bay Packers and played with the team from 1946–51 and in 1953.  He played in the Pro Bowl following the 1951 season.

In 1957, he was inducted into the College Football Hall of Fame and in 1973 he was inducted into the Packers Hall of Fame.

References

External links

 

1921 births
2006 deaths
All-American college football players
American football tackles
United States Navy personnel of World War II
College Football Hall of Fame inductees
Green Bay Packers players
Minnesota Golden Gophers football players
People from Anoka County, Minnesota
Players of American football from Minnesota
Sportspeople from the Minneapolis–Saint Paul metropolitan area
United States Navy officers
Western Conference Pro Bowl players
People from Scotland, South Dakota
People from Anoka, Minnesota
Military personnel from Minnesota